Jacob Ben-Ami (November 23 or December 23, 1890, Minsk, Russian Empire – July 2, 1977, New York City, New York, United States) was a noted Belarusian-born Jewish stage actor who performed equally well in Yiddish and English.

Biography
Ben-Ami was born in 1890 and grew up in Russia, performing in various acting troupes, before emigrating to the United States in 1912. He had a long and distinguished international career, including acting in, staging and directing a number of Broadway plays. In 1918, he founded or co-founded the Jewish Art Theatre.

Ben-Ami's first English-language production was the 1920 Broadway play Samson and Delilah. According to biographer Alan Gansberg in Little Caesar: A Biography of Edward G. Robinson, Ben-Ami earned fellow cast member Robinson's disdain by allegedly trying to upstage the other actors and overacting. Both the play and Ben-Ami, however, were hits. In her 1921 review of the production, Dorothy Parker proclaimed him "one of the greatest actors on the stage today." He was also lauded by John Barrymore ("inspired"), The New York Times and Alexander Woollcott ("the cocktail question of the year was 'Ben-Ami or not Ben-Ami'"), among others.

He had much less success in Eugene O'Neill's 1924 play Welded, in which he starred. Among other problems, the style of play did not suit Ben-Ami, and he had a thick accent. Welded closed after three weeks and 24 performances.

On March 9, 1943, he starred in a mass memorial service to the 2,000,000 Jews who had, up to that date, been murdered by the Nazis in Europe. The service, staged at Madison Square Garden in New York, was called We Will Never Die and during the two performances attracted 40,000 people.

His last Broadway play was The Tenth Man, written by Paddy Chayefsky; it had one of the longer runs on Broadway at 623 performances from November 5, 1959, to May 13, 1961.

As an established star, Ben-Ami helped the then-unknown John Garfield get accepted into the American Laboratory Theater.

He also co-directed the 1937 film Green Fields with Edgar G. Ulmer and appeared in the films The Wandering Jew (1933) and Esperanza (1949), and on television.

His niece is the actress and film director Jennifer Warren.

See also
 Yiddish theatre

References

External links
 January 1, 1922, photograph 
 Half-length portrait caricature in the Library of Congress
 Jacob Ben-Ami portrait with Doris Keane, 1924

1890 births
1977 deaths
Emigrants from the Russian Empire to the United States
Jewish American male actors
American theatre directors
Yiddish theatre performers
Actors from Minsk
People from Minsky Uyezd
Jews from the Russian Empire
20th-century American Jews